Saveriano Infantino (born 16 September 1986) is an Italian professional footballer who plays as a forward for  club Gelbison.

Club career
On 9 January 2023, Infantino joined Gelbison.

References

External links

1986 births
Living people
Sportspeople from the Province of Matera
Footballers from Basilicata
Italian footballers
Association football forwards
Serie C players
Serie D players
A.S. Melfi players
F.C. Matera players
S.S. Ebolitana 1925 players
U.S. Bitonto players
S.S. Fidelis Andria 1928 players
A.S.D. Barletta 1922 players
L'Aquila Calcio 1927 players
S.E.F. Torres 1903 players
S.S. Ischia Isolaverde players
Carrarese Calcio players
Matera Calcio players
U.S. Catanzaro 1929 players
S.S. Teramo Calcio players
Taranto F.C. 1927 players